Tim Heatley (born 13 November 1980) is a British property developer and co-founder of Capital & Centric.

Background 
Heatley was born and grew up in Eccles, Salford. He studied law from Manchester Metropolitan University. While studying at university, he began selling art and restoring cars. He used this money to buy and redevelop his first property after graduating from university.

Career 
Heatley co-founded Capital & Centric with Adam Higgins in November 2011. The company has been described as a “major disruptor” in property development by Insider Media. The developer won a national placemaking award in 2020 for Kampus, a £250m garden neighbourhood project in Manchester City Centre. Business Insider ranked the co-founders 87 in its 2020 Power 100 list.

In 2020, Heatley and a number of Capital & Centric’s projects were featured in a 2020 BBC2 documentary, Manctopia, looking at Manchester’s property boom and its impact on the housing market and local communities. Heatley's real estate firm while providing affordable housing solutions is involved in multiple projects which do not provide affordable housing as well. His proposals and planning regarding converting and developing old buildings and mills into thriving neighborhood has witnessed mixed receptions where certain group of citizens believed that such an initiative would actually solve the basic problem of housing at Manchester where some group of citizens are apprehensive about their old neighborhood getting modified against their interest.

Heatley has faced questions around the shortage of affordable housing across Manchester and the company’s record of delivering new affordable homes as part of its developments. He identified the lack of a national policy on city centre affordable housing as a barrier for developers to deliver more affordable homes, arguing: “Developers who want to build affordable homes are being priced out when purchasing the land or buildings. A developer who decides to build non-affordable homes as part of a project can bid higher”. In an interview on the BBC2 Manctopia documentary, Heatley disclosed his company's aim to deliver a 100 per cent affordable housing scheme in Manchester city centre.

Heatley's Capital & Centric founded the Regeneration Brainery initiative, a mentoring project that aims to support young people from a range of backgrounds to take up careers in the property and development sector and “widen the talent pool.” Capital & Centric also co-founded the Embassy Bus initiative with Stockport-based charity, Embassy, which converted a former luxury tour bus into temporary accommodation for the homeless in Greater Manchester. In 2017, Heatley and Higgins was in news for the policy driven sale of flats at their Crusader Mill development in Manchester only to local owner occupiers while banning any investors.

Heatley is known as an active campaigner on tackling homelessness across Greater Manchester. He is the current chair of the Greater Manchester Mayor's Charity that prioritizes ending rough sleeping and homelessness. The charity has raised more than £2,000,000 and during the COVID-19 pandemic while opening a food and supplies depot in Manchester city centre to support the homeless and rough sleepers in partnership with Capital & Centric. The charity is also known for partnering with Manchester's music, art and culture scene as part of its fundraising, holding concerts and art festivals.

See also 

 Capital & Centric
 Manchester City Centre

References 

1980 births
British philanthropists
British real estate businesspeople

Living people